Dominique Ristori (Toulon, 12 March 1952) is a European civil servant from France. From January 2014 to August 2019, Ristori was the director-general of the Directorate-General for Energy within the European Commission.

Career

In 1973 Ristori became a Bachelor of Law (Licencié en Droit) and gained a Certificate in International Studies from the University of Nice. In 1975 he became a graduate of Sciences Po Paris.

Ristori entered the European Civil Service in 1978 as assistant to the director and then to the director-general at the Personnel and Administration Directorate-General (DG ADMIN). In 1990 he became Head of Division in charge of Transnational cooperation between SMEs at the Directorate-General for Enterprise Policy (DG ENTR). From May 1996 to December 1999 Ristori was the Director in charge of European Energy Policy at the Directorate-General for Energy (ENER). From January 2000 to July 2006 he was the Director in charge of General Affairs and Resources at the Directorate-General for Energy and Transport (TREN). From 2006 to 2010 he was the European Commission's Deputy Director General for Energy and Transport, in charge of nuclear
energy policy.

He was the Director General of the Joint Research Centre of the European Commission (December 2010-December 2013).

In January 2014 Ristori was appointed as the director-general of DG Energy, succeeding Phillip Lowe. His appointment was extended in February 2018, with unanimous decision of the College of Commissioners, as he had passed the retirement age of 65. He was replaced by Ditte Juul Jørgensen in August 2019.

He is married to Irène Souka, from 2008 to 2020 Director-General for Human Resources at the European Commission.

Award 
 Officer of the Legion of Honour (2019). Knight (2008)

References

Year of birth missing (living people)
Living people
European civil servants
French officials of the European Union
Officiers of the Légion d'honneur